Christophorus may refer to:
Saint Christopher
Antipope Christopher disputedly held the papacy 903–904
Christophorus III (1873-1932), Catholicos-Patriarch of All Georgia 1927-1932
Christophorus Records
Christophorus, Porsche AG's customer magazine